Court hand (also common law hand, Anglicana, cursiva antiquior, charter hand) was a style of handwriting used in medieval English law courts, and later by professionals such as lawyers and clerks. "It is noticeably upright and packed together with exaggeratedly long ascenders and descenders, the latter often and the former occasionally brought round in sweeping crescent shaped curves".

The hand took its name from the fact that it was particularly associated with formal records of the courts of Common Pleas and King's (or Queen's) Bench, although its use was not confined to them. In the 17th and 18th centuries the writing became increasingly stylised, to the point that it was virtually illegible to any reader unfamiliar with its conventions. The hand was banned from English law courts in 1731 by the Proceedings in Courts of Justice Act (4 Geo. II, c. 26), which required that, with effect from 25 March 1733, court proceedings "shall be written in such a common legible Hand and Character, as the Acts of Parliament are usually ingrossed in ... and not in any Hand commonly called Court Hand, and in Words at Length and not abbreviated". Even in the 19th century, however, an ability to read court hand was considered useful for anyone who had to deal with old court records.

Cultural references 
In Shakespeare's Henry VI, Part 2 (written c.1591), Act 4, scene 2, Dick the Butcher says of Emmanuel, Clerk of Chatham, "He can make Obligations, and write court-hand."

In Charles Dickens's novel Bleak House (1852–3), Lady Dedlock begins a significant subplot by noticing a particular "law hand" on a legal document.

Court hand is referred to in T. H. White's novel The Sword in the Stone (1938).

See also

References

Sources

External links 
Samples of court hand

English law
Latin-script calligraphy
Medieval scripts
Western calligraphy
Writing